Antichthon is the peer-reviewed academic journal of the Australasian Society for Classical Studies. The focus of the journal is ancient Greece and Rome, however, its scope is broadly defined so as to embrace the ancient Near East and the Mediterranean from the beginnings of civilisation to the Early Middle Ages.

External links 
 

Classics journals
Annual journals
English-language journals
Publications established in 1967
Cambridge University Press academic journals